The 1949 South Sydney was the 42nd in the club's history. The club competed in the New South Wales Rugby Football League Premiership (NSWRFL), finishing the season as runner-ups and minor premiers.

Ladder

Fixtures

Regular season

Finals

References

South Sydney Rabbitohs seasons
1949 in Australian rugby league